The National Republican Party (PRN) was a Spanish political party created in 1895 by supporters of José Tomás Muro, who lost his leadership bid for the Progressive Republican Party to José María Esquerdo, and the Republican Constitutional Union. In 1897 it merged into the wider Republican Fusion alliance.

References

Defunct political parties in Spain
Defunct liberal political parties
Political parties established in 1895
Political parties disestablished in 1897
1895 establishments in Spain
1897 disestablishments in Spain
Radical parties
Republican parties in Spain
Restoration (Spain)